Heras may refer to:

Heras (company), a temporary fencing company
Heras (moth), a genus of moths
Heras (surname), a surname
Heras (physician) (Ήρας), a Greek physician from Cappadocia, probably in the 1st century BC.

See also
Hera (disambiguation)